Idrissa Traoré is a former Malian football referee. He officiated the Group C match between Canada and the Soviet Union at the 1986 World Cup. He also officiated at the 1980, 1982, 1986, 1988 and 1990 African Cup of Nations. At the time of the start of the 1986 World Cup, he was 38 years old.

References

External links
 1986 FIFA World Cup Mexico

Living people
1940s births
Malian football referees
FIFA World Cup referees
1986 FIFA World Cup referees
21st-century Malian people